The brown-bellied broad-nosed bat (Platyrrhinus fusciventris) is a species of bat in the family Phyllostomidae. As a phyllostomid bat, it is characterized by a narrow uropatagium which is fringed with hair; a white dorsal stripe; large inner upper incisors convergent at the tips; and three upper and three lower molars. It is found in Guyana, Suriname, French Guiana, Trinidad and Tobago, northern Brazil, eastern Ecuador, and southern Venezuela. It is closely related to Platyrrhinus incarum and Platyrrhinus angustirostris.

References

Further reading
Velazco, PAÚL M., and BURTON K. Lim. "A new species of broad-nosed bat Platyrrhinus Saussure, 1860 (Chiroptera: Phyllostomidae) from the Guianan Shield." Zootaxa 3796.1 (2014): 175–193.
Castro, Isai Jorge de, and Fernanda Michalski. "Bats of a varzea forest in the estuary of the Amazon River, state of Amapá, Northern Brazil." Biota Neotropica 15.2 (2015): 1–8.
CATZEFLIS, François. "Liste des Mammifères de Guyane française (octobre 2014)."

External links

Platyrrhinus
Mammals of Trinidad and Tobago
Mammals of the Caribbean